Ilūkstes pilsētas stadions is a multi-purpose stadium in Ilūkste, Latvia.  It is currently used mostly for football matches and is the home stadium of Ilūkstes NSS. The stadium holds 500 people. In June 2013 it was opened after a renovation to fit the Latvian Higher League standards.

References 

Ilūkste
Football venues in Latvia
Multi-purpose stadiums in Latvia